The 1936–37 season was the 39th in the history of the Southern League. The league reverted to a single division after four of the league's nineteen clubs left at the end of the previous season. Newly elected Ipswich Town won the title at the first attempt, whilst Margate left the league at the end of the season. Ipswich applied for election to the Football League, but were unsuccessful.

Final table

The league comprised the seven remaining clubs from the Eastern Division, the eight clubs remaining in the Western Division and one new club.

Newly elected team:
 Ipswich Town - elected from the Eastern Counties League.

Football League election
Ipswich Town were the only non-League club to apply for election to the Football League Third Division South, but won fewer votes than League clubs Exeter City and Aldershot.

References

1936-37
4
1936–37 in Welsh football